Live in Europe is a live album by Australian world music quintet, Mara!. The album was released in April 2001.

At the ARIA Music Awards of 2001, the album won the ARIA Award for Best World Music Album.

Track listing 
 "Na Dolu"
 "Glastonbury Lullaby"
 "All Summer"
 "Eyes Like Berries"
 "Ovdovyala Lissichkata"
 "Alessandria"
 "Nesine Taksim"
 "Nesine"
 "The Big Pack"
 "Tu Madre Quando Te Pario"
 "Fair Kop"
 "The Big Dance"

References 

2001 live albums
Live albums by Australian artists
ARIA Award-winning albums